Sevim Demircan (born 15 February 2000) is a Turkish  female para-athlete competing in the T20 disability class sprint events of 200 m and 400 m.

Private life
Sevim Demircan was born in Burhaniye district of Balıkesir on 15 February 2000.

Sports career
At the 2017 World Para Athletics Grand Prix in Dubai, United Arab Emirates, she placed seventh in the 200 m T20/38/44/47 event. She became world champion in the 400 m event at the 2018 INAS Indoor Athletics Championships held in Val-de-Reuil, France. She won the bronze medal in the 400 m T20 event at the 2019 World Para Athletics Junior Championships held in Nottwil, Switzerland.

Achievements

References

2000 births
Living people
Sportspeople from Balıkesir
Female competitors in athletics with disabilities
People from Burhaniye
Turkish female sprinters
Paralympic athletes of Turkey
21st-century Turkish sportswomen